Tirak Deh-e Olya (also Romanized as Tīrak Deh-e ‘Olyā; also known as Nīrak Deh-e Bālā and Tīryak Deh-e Bālā) is a village in Mian Band Rural District, in the Central District of Nur County, Mazandaran Province, Iran. At the 2006 census, its population was 426, in 99 families.

References 

Populated places in Nur County